Fc fragment of IgG receptor IIc (gene/pseudogene) is a protein that in humans is encoded by the FCGR2C gene.

Function

This gene encodes one of three members of a family of low-affinity immunoglobulin gamma Fc receptors found on the surface of many immune response cells. The encoded protein is a transmembrane glycoprotein and may be involved in phagocytosis and clearing of immune complexes. An allelic polymorphism in this gene results in both coding and non-coding variants.

References

Further reading